The NanKang Biotech Incubation Center (NBIC) is a biotech incubator formed by the SME Foundation of the Ministry of Economic Affairs, ROC and managed by the Development Center for Biotechnology. The incubator focuses on the initiation and development of biotech startups with an emphasis of the biotech industry including pharmaceuticals, medical devices and applied biotech.
NBIC is a model incubator in biotech industry, different from the university affiliated incubator, supported by the SME Foundation. As of 2015, the incubator has 21 Class I client companies, 1 Class II, and 20 Class III. Beside office space, the incubator provides wet laboratory with instruments and facilities.

Recognition
NBIC is accredited by the National Business Incubation Association (NBIA) since 2011 as a Soft Landings incubator. A full article reported the incubator extensively in The Business Incubator, pp34–39, Volume 1 Issue 1, June–September 2012.

Parent organization
Development Center for Biotechnology/SMEA

References

2004 establishments in Taiwan